Gmyrdek is a river of Poland, a tributary of the river Ruptawka near Jastrzębie-Zdrój.

Rivers of Poland
Rivers of Silesian Voivodeship